"Three minute men" were patrons of a quasi-legal prostitution industry north of Hotel Street near Honolulu Harbor from December 1941 to September 1944 (World War II).  After martial law was declared in Honolulu, local police corruption and regulations were superseded, and a price of three dollars was set by military authorities.  To satisfy an immense demand, men were kept in a "bullpen" of three or more rooms, permitting men to dress and undress in assembly-line fashion, while each received only three minutes of personal attention.  The practice may have been initiated by Jean O'Hara.

References

Prostitution in Hawaii
Men in the United States